Frank Munro (27 April 1934 – 20 January 2011) was an Australian rules footballer who played with Carlton and Richmond in the Victorian Football League (VFL).

Notes

External links 

Frank Munro's profile at Blueseum

1934 births
Carlton Football Club players
Richmond Football Club players
Australian rules footballers from Victoria (Australia)
2011 deaths